The WV postcode area, also known as the Wolverhampton postcode area, is a group of sixteen postcode districts in England, within four post towns. These cover Wolverhampton, Willenhall and Bilston in the West Midlands, plus parts of south-west Staffordshire and south-east Shropshire (including Bridgnorth).

Mail for this area is sorted, along with mail for the adjacent DY postcode area, at the North West Midlands Mail Centre in Wolverhampton.



Coverage
The approximate coverage of the postcode districts:

|-
! WV1
| WOLVERHAMPTON
| Wolverhampton City Centre, Horseley Fields, East Park
| Wolverhampton
|-
! style="background:#FFFFFF;"|WV1
| style="background:#FFFFFF;"|WILLENHALL
| style="background:#FFFFFF;"|PO Boxes
| style="background:#FFFFFF;"|non-geographic
|-
! WV2
| WOLVERHAMPTON
| All Saints, Blakenhall, Parkfields
| Wolverhampton
|-
! WV3
| WOLVERHAMPTON
| Finchfield, Compton, Castlecroft
| Wolverhampton
|-
! WV4
| WOLVERHAMPTON
| Penn, Warstones, Merry Hill, parts of Goldthorn Park and Parkfields
| Wolverhampton, South Staffordshire
|-
! WV5
| WOLVERHAMPTON
| Wombourne, Claverley
| South Staffordshire, Shropshire
|-
! WV6
| WOLVERHAMPTON
| Whitmore Reans, Perton, Pattingham, Tettenhall, Ackleton
| Wolverhampton, South Staffordshire, Shropshire
|-
! WV7
| WOLVERHAMPTON
| Albrighton
| Shropshire, South Staffordshire
|-
! WV8
| WOLVERHAMPTON
| Codsall, Rakegate, Bilbrook, Pendeford (west)
| South Staffordshire, Shropshire, Wolverhampton
|-
! WV9
| WOLVERHAMPTON
| Pendeford, Coven
| Wolverhampton, South Staffordshire
|-
! WV10
| WOLVERHAMPTON
| Low Hill, Bushbury, Heath Town, Fordhouses, Fallings Park, Featherstone, Shareshill, parts of Wednesfield and Brinsford
| Wolverhampton, South Staffordshire
|-
! WV11
| WOLVERHAMPTON
| Wednesfield, Essington
| Wolverhampton, South Staffordshire
|-
! WV12
| WILLENHALL
| Short Heath, Lodge Farm
| Walsall, Wolverhampton
|-
! WV13
| WILLENHALL
| Willenhall Town, Shepwell Green
| Walsall, Wolverhampton
|-
! WV14
| BILSTON
| Bradley, Bilston Town, Coseley
| Wolverhampton, Dudley
|-
! WV15
| BRIDGNORTH
| Bridgnorth (Low Town)
| Shropshire
|-
! WV16
| BRIDGNORTH
| Bridgnorth (High Town), Ditton Priors
| Shropshire
|-
! style="background:#FFFFFF;"|WV98
| style="background:#FFFFFF;"|WOLVERHAMPTON
| style="background:#FFFFFF;"|Jobcentre Plus
| style="background:#FFFFFF;"|non-geographic
|-
! style="background:#FFFFFF;"|WV99
| style="background:#FFFFFF;"|WOLVERHAMPTON
| style="background:#FFFFFF;"|Jobcentre Plus
| style="background:#FFFFFF;"|non-geographic
|}

Map

See also
Postcode Address File
List of postcode areas in the United Kingdom

References

External links
Royal Mail's Postcode Address File
A quick introduction to Royal Mail's Postcode Address File (PAF)

Wolverhampton
Postcode areas covering the West Midlands (region)
Shropshire